Blood Lines by Eileen Wilks is the 5th novel in the World of the Lupi series. It was released on January 2, 2007.

It hit the #8 place on Barnes & Noble's Bestselling Books in Contemporary Romance on 01/05/07.

Plot introduction
FBI agent Cynna Weaver teams up with sorcerer Cullen Seabourne to help identify elected officials who have accepted demonic pacts. But the passion simmering between them-and their investigation-spiral out of control when an ancient prophecy is fulfilled.

Main characters
Lily Yu - a Chinese American sensitive who works for the Magical Crimes Division of the FBI
Rule Turner - the Nokolai Heir (or prince as the press like to dub him). His werewolf clan is located in San Diego, CA.
Grandmother - Lily Yu's grandmother to be exact. She is an authoritative and sometimes downright bossy woman, but it is usually best to listen to her advice. She knows more than she usually lets on.
Cynna Weaver - a Finder whose image decorates the cover of Blood lines. The tattoos are how Cynna works her special brand of magic.
Cullen Seabourne - a recent adoption to Rule's Nokolai werewolf clan. Cullen was clanless for many years. He is also a sorcerer, which is a slightly illegal pastime according to the federal authorities. Eileen describes him as sin incarnate to look at.

Footnotes

External links
Eileen Wilks Official website

2007 American novels
Werewolf novels
Novels by Eileen Wilks
World of the Lupi books
American fantasy novels
American romance novels